The Political Movement for Social Security (Movimiento Político por la Seguridad Social) is a progressive political party in Colombia. 
At the last legislative elections, 10 March 2002, the party won as one of the many small parties parliamentary representation.

Political parties in Colombia
Progressive parties in Colombia